Cyril J. O'Sullivan (22 February 1920 – March 2003) was an English professional association footballer of the 1940s. Born in Lewisham, he joined Reading in September 1946 and made 36 appearances in The Football League. He later joined Gillingham of the Southern League, as understudy to regular goalkeeper Johnny Burke. He made only one appearance for the Gills' first team.

References

1920 births
Footballers from Lewisham
English footballers
English Football League players
Reading F.C. players
Gillingham F.C. players
2003 deaths
Association football goalkeepers